Rodná is a municipality and village in Tábor District in the South Bohemian Region of the Czech Republic. It has about 100 inhabitants.

Administrative parts
Villages of Blanička and Nahořany are administrative parts of Rodná.

Gallery

References

Villages in Tábor District